The 1988 World Cup took place 8–11 December at Royal Melbourne Golf Club in Melbourne, Australia. It was the 34th World Cup event. It was a stroke play team event with 32 teams. Each team consisted of two players from a country. 22 teams were qualified through the 1987 tournament and another 10 teams were invited. The combined score of each team determined the team results. The United States team of Ben Crenshaw and Mark McCumber won by one stroke over the Japan team of  brothers Masashi "Jumbo" Ozaki and Tateo "Jet" Ozaki The individual competition was won by Crenshaw.

Teams

Scores 
Team

International Trophy

Sources:

References

World Cup (men's golf)
Golf tournaments in Australia
Sports competitions in Melbourne
World Cup
World Cup